İnağzı Cave is a cave located in Zonguldak, northern Turkey.

References

Caves of Turkey
Caves of Zonguldak Province